Sushma Karki is Nepalese glamour model and film actress, known for her works in Nepali Cinema. She began her acting career with Arun Khatri.

Media spotlight
Karki became popular because of her brother Rejan bala who supported her for item dance Udhreko choli in Nepali movie Loot and for her bold role in movie Bindass (2012). The item dance made her career established in Nepali movie industry. She has also received a lot of coverage over her Tattoo and Bikini pictures.

Filmography

|2020

References

External links
 
 

Nepalese female models
Living people
People from Bardiya District
1986 births
Nepalese film actresses
Actresses in Nepali cinema
21st-century Nepalese actresses